Phelim Alfred Calleary (3 October 1895 – 4 January 1974) was an Irish Fianna Fáil politician who served as a Teachta Dála (TD) for Mayo North constituency from 1952 to 1969.

He was elected as a Fianna Fáil TD for the Mayo North constituency at the June 1952 by-election, caused by the death of P. J. Ruttledge. He was re-elected at each subsequent general election until retiring at the 1969 general election.

His son Seán Calleary was a Fianna Fáil TD for Mayo East from 1973 to 1992 and served as a Minister of State in a number of government departments. His grandson Dara Calleary was elected as a Fianna Fáil TD for the Mayo constituency at the 2007 general election.

See also
Families in the Oireachtas

References

 

1895 births
1974 deaths
Phelim
Fianna Fáil TDs
Members of the 14th Dáil
Members of the 15th Dáil
Members of the 16th Dáil
Members of the 17th Dáil
Members of the 18th Dáil
Politicians from County Mayo